Cryptophlebia ombrodelta, the litchi fruit moth or macadamia nut borer, is a moth of the family Tortricidae. The species was first described by Oswald Bertram Lower in 1898. It is native to India, Sri Lanka, Nepal, Indonesia, China, Taiwan, Vietnam, Thailand, western Malaysia, New Guinea, the Philippines, Japan, Guam, the Caroline Islands, Australia and has been introduced to Hawaii.

Description
The wingspan is 15–22 mm. Forewings brownish to reddish brown. A dark-brown pre-tornal spot is distinctive in females, but faded in males. Males possess sex scales on the hindwing, hind tibia, and abdomen. Females with a costal fold on forewings, which is absent in males.

Eggs are white, round and flat, and laid in small groups of 15 on the fruit. Late instars are 13–20 mm long. The abdomen of the caterpillar is yellowish white. In the final instar, its color turns to red. Pinacula large and darker than body. Head and prothoracic shield blackish to dark brown in early instars which turns pale to yellowish brown in final instars. Anal comb rudimentary with 4-6 small teeth. Pupa yellow brown.

Pest attack
It is considered a pest of legumes. The larvae feed in the pods, attacking seeds in the jenkol-pods (Pithecellobium) and only become visible after the seeds are cut. The larva nearly empties the seed, which then only contains tunnels filled with frass.

The larvae is a minor polyphagous pest and feeds on a wide range of plants.

Larval host plants

Acacia sp.
Acacia farnesiana
Acacia nilotica
Adenanthera pavonina
Aegle marmelos
Averrhoa carambola
Bauhinia hirsuta
Bauhinia malabarica
Bauhinia purpurea
Buckinghamia celsissima
Caesalpinia decapetala
Caesalpinia pulcherrima
Caesalpinia sappan
Cassia fistula
Cassia occidentalis
Cassia alata
Cassia sophera
Cassia bicapsularis
Citrus sp.
Coccoloba uvifera
Cocos nucifera
Cupaniopsis anacardioides
Delonix regia
Dimocarpus longan
Feronia sp.
Filicium decipiens
Glycine max
Indigofera suffruticosa
Limonia acidissima
Litchi chinensis
Macadamia sp.
Nephelium litchi
Nephelium lappaceum
Parkia sp.
Parkinsonia aculeata
Phaseolus lunatus
Phaseolus vulgaris
Pithecellobium dulce.
Poinciana pulcherrima
Prosopis juliflora
Prosopis pallida
Senna alata
Senna bicapsularis
Senna occidentalis
Senna septemtrionalis
Senna sophera
Sesbania aculeata
Sesbania bispinosa
Sesbania grandiflora
Tamarindus indica

Control
Adult moths can be eradicated by mechanical methods such as hand picking and trapping. Passive trapping methods such as emergence traps, flight traps, malaise traps and sticky traps are ineffective. Bait traps are also found ineffective to catch adults. Light traps, suction traps and pheromone traps are effective. It is also found that the Robinson light trap attracted more males than females.

Parasitoids such as Trichogramma cryptophlebiae, Brachymeria pomonae, Gotro bimaculata and Bracon species can be used to destroy eggs and caterpillars.

Other methods such as mating disruption, hot water treatments, irradiation and usage of insecticides can also be used.

References

Bradley, J. D. 1953. Some important species of the genus Cryptophlebia Walsingham, 1899, with descriptions of three new species (Lepidoptera: Olethreutidae). Bulletin of Entomological Research. 43: 679–689.
Horak, M. 2006. Olethreutine moths of Australia (Lepidoptera: Tortricidae). Monographs on Australian Lepidoptera, Vol. 10. 522 pp.
Jones, V. P. 1994. Feeding by Cryptophlebia illepida and C. ombrodelta (Lepidoptera: Tortricidae) on macadamia nut abortion. Journal of Economic Entomology. 87: 781–786.

External links
Eurasian Tortricidae
A life system study of Cryptophlebia ombrodelta (Lower) (Lepidoptera: Tortricidae) in southeast Queensland
Trapping Cryptophlebia illepida and C. ombrodelta (Lepidoptera: Tortricidae) in macadamia in Hawaii
Biology of macadamia nut borer (Cryptophlebia ombrodelta (Lower)) 1974
Record of Cryptophlebia ombrodelta (Lower) (Tortricidae: Lepitoptera) on bael (Aegle marmelos) and tamarind (Tamarindus indica) in eastern India
Semiochemicals of Cryptophlebia ombrodelta, the Macadamia nut borer
Cryptophlebia ombrodelta (Lower, 1898) legal status

Grapholitini
Moths described in 1898
Moths of Japan